Rosewood Almanac is the sixth studio album by American singer-songwriter Will Stratton. It was released on May 12, 2017 through Bella Union.

Track listing

References

2017 albums
Bella Union albums
Will Stratton albums